Ildikó Raimondi (born 11 November 1962) is a Hungarian-Austrian operatic soprano and academic voice teacher. She has been a member of the Vienna State Opera since 1991, and has performed leading roles internationally, especially in Mozart operas. She also works in concert and lied, including contemporary compositions. She has received Austrian awards.

Career 
Ildikó Clara Szabo was born on 11 November 1962 in Arad, Romania. After studies in her home country and engagements there and in Italy, Raimondi won first prize in the operetta category at the 7th International Hans Gabor Belvedere Singing Competition in 1988.

Since 1991 she has been a member of the ensemble of the Vienna State Opera, where she has appeared in more than 40 roles, including Mozart's Susanna in Le nozze di Figaro, Zerlina in Don Giovanni, and Pamina in Die Zauberflöte. She appeared there as Mimi in Puccini's La bohème and  Rosalinde in the operetta Die Fledermaus by Johann Strauss. She appeared as Micaela in Bizet's Carmen also at the Bregenz Festival, as Marzelline in Beethoven's Fidelio at the 1996 Edinburgh Festival Fringe, conducted by Charles Mackerras, and at the Salzburg Festival, performing works by Mozart and Egon Wellesz. Raimondi appeared as a guest at the Deutsche Oper Berlin, the Semperoper in Dresden, the Bavarian State Opera in Munich, the Zürich Opera House, and the Bolshoi Theatre In Moscow. She sang the part of Marzelline in Fidelio, conducted by Zubin Mehta, in the opening season of the Palau de les Arts Reina Sofia, the new opera house of Valencia.

Raimondi has performed in concerts, on radio and television in many European countries, in Japan, Indonesia, the U.S. and Israel. She has sung sacred music, for example in the Schubertiade of the Vienna Musikverein, and in Bach's and Haydn's oratorios. She performed Mozart works at the Wiener Klangbogen and at the Wiener Festwochen. She has interpreted music of the 20th century, including works by Franz Schmidt, Arnold Schoenberg, Alexander von Zemlinsky, Egon Wellesz, Ernst Krenek, Gottfried von Einem, Paul Hindemith, Friedrich Cerha and Thomas Daniel Schlee. In 2003, Raimondi issued a collection of 41 songs by the Czech composer Václav Tomášek on texts by Johann Wolfgang von Goethe. In 2011 she recorded the new gender-neutral text versions of the Austrian national anthem.

Raimondi has been professor of voice at the Mozarteum University Salzburg in Salzburg since October 2015.

Awards 
 2004: Österreichische Kammersängerin
 2014: Austrian Decoration for Science and Art

Repertoire

Opera 
 Susanna – The Marriage of Figaro
 Zerlina – Don Giovanni
 Pamina, First Lady – The Magic Flute
 Marzelline – Fidelio
 Freia – Das Rheingold
 Gutrune – Götterdämmerung
 Ighino – Palestrina
 Zdenka – Arabella
 Sophie – Weiße Rose
 Adina – L'elisir d'amore
 Alice – Falstaff
 Lauretta – Gianni Schicchi
 Mimi, Musette – La bohème
 Nedda – Pagliacci
 Antonia – The Tales of Hoffmann
 Micaela – Carmen

Operetta 
 Adele, Rosalinde – Die Fledermaus
 Gräfin Gabriele – Wiener Blut
 Hanna Glawari – Die lustige Witwe
 Angele Didier – Der Graf von Luxemburg
 Fedora – Die Zirkusprinzessin

Concert 
 Bach – Passions, masses, cantatas
 Mozart – Masses, Requiem, concert arias
 Haydn – Masses, Die Schöpfung, Die Jahreszeiten

 Bruckner –

Lieder 
 Mozart, Haydn, Beethoven, Schubert, Schumann, Brahms, Wolf (also orchestral songs), Strauss (also orchestral songs), Pfitzner, Schönberg, Zemlinsky (also orchestral songs), Berg, Songs by various masters from the 17th century to the present etc.

Recordings 

 Liszt Oubliée – organum classics 2015
 Johan Wenzel Tomaschek – Goethe Lieder / Paladino 2011
 Wiener Opernfest 2005 / Orfeo
 Gruß an Wien 2005 / Arts
 Lieder des Lebens 2002 / ORF
 Ein deutsches Requiem 2002 / ORF
 Don Giovanni 2002 / Naxos Records
 Fidelio 1998 / Telarc

References

External links 

 
 
 
 3rd Concert Salzburg Festival
 Egon Wellesz Archiv at Egon Wellesz
 KS Ildikó Raimondi at Vienna State Opera
 Raimondi at Operabase
 Ildiko Raimondi: Christmas in Vienna (2005) (YouTube)

1962 births
Living people
Austrian operatic sopranos
Österreichischer Kammersänger
Academic staff of Mozarteum University Salzburg
Recipients of the Austrian Decoration for Science and Art
People from Arad, Romania